Omar Hernández (born 20 January 1962) is a former Colombian racing cyclist. He rode in eleven Grand Tours between 1986 and 1991.

References

External links
 

1962 births
Living people
Colombian male cyclists
Sportspeople from Bogotá
Colombian Vuelta a España stage winners